2-Butyne (dimethylacetylene, crotonylene or but-2-yne) is an alkyne with chemical formula CH3C≡CCH3.  Produced artificially, it is a colorless, volatile, pungent liquid at standard temperature and pressure.

2-Butyne is of interest to physical chemists because of its very low torsional barrier and the problem of determining that barrier using high-resolution infrared spectroscopy. Analysis of its spectrum
leads to a determination that the torsional barrier is only 6 cm−1 (1.2 J or 72 J mol−1). However, it has not been determined whether the equilibrium structure is eclipsed (D3h) or staggered (D3d). Symmetry analysis using the Molecular Symmetry Group G36 shows that one would need to analyse its high resolution rotation-vibration Raman spectrum to determine its equilibrium structure.

2-Butyne (dimethylethyne) forms with 5-decyne (dibutylethyne), 4-octyne (dipropylethyne) and 3-hexyne (diethylethyne) a group of symmetric alkynes.

Synthesis
2-Butyne can be synthesized by the rearrangement reaction of ethylacetylene in a solution of ethanolic potassium hydroxide.

Applications
2-Butyne, along with propyne, is used to synthesize alkylated hydroquinones in the total synthesis of Vitamin E.

See also
1-Butyne, a position isomer

References

Alkynes